Vijay Kishanlal Kedia is an Indian investor born in Kolkata. He has been involved in the market since he was 19 years old. Kedia and his company - Kedia Securities Pvt. Ltd., are the largest shareholder (after the promoter) in several listed companies.  Kedia was a keynote speaker at IIM Ahmedabad, IIM Bangalore & MDI Murshidabad . and he has been a TEDx speaker 2 timesHe was invited to speak at London Business School. 

He has been described by the Economic Times as a "market master".

Career 
He realized his passion for stock market when he was 14 and joined the stock market when he turned 19. He started doing his own trading without any success.  After few years he left Kolkata and came to Mumbai to try his luck. In 2004 and 2005 he identified and invested in three such shares (Atul auto, Aegis logistics, Cera sanitaryware) which appreciated more than 100 times in next 10 to 12 years. In early 2012, he correctly predicted that India was at the beginning of a structural bull run. In 2016 Kedia was featured at #13 in Business World list of Successful Investors In India  In 2017 "MoneyLife Advisory" launched an "Ask Vijay Kedia microsite  In 2017 Vijay Kedia's portfolio stocks rose up to 170%. In 2018, he was invited to speak at London Business School. In November 2018, he was invited to speak at TEDx.

Investment strategy 
Kedia strictly adheres to SMILE as a principle in investing; which translates into Small in size, Medium in experience, Large in aspiration and Extra-large in market potential. On his investment strategy, Kedia said: "One should scout for companies which have good management... Find a very good management, a very honest management and see the product in which the management is going to grow, going to outperform its peers and the economy... invest in those companies for the next 10–15 years, and you cannot go wrong." Bet big and ride through tough times is his advice  While luck plays a big part in stock market investments, knowledge, courage and patience are the cornerstones according to him. He has been 100 percent invested for the past 30 years of his investing career.

References 

Living people
Bombay Stock Exchange
Investment in India
Stock traders
Indian financial analysts
Year of birth missing (living people)
Indian investors